Private Lessons is a 2008 Belgian drama film directed by Joachim Lafosse. It was written by Lafosse and François Pirot. It was screened in the Directors' Fortnight section at the 2008 Cannes Film Festival on 19 May. It was nominated for seven Magritte Awards and was awarded Best Actor for Jonathan Zaccaï and Most Promising Actress for Pauline Étienne.

Cast
 Jonas Bloquet as Jonas
 Jonathan Zaccaï as Pierre
 Yannick Renier as Didier
 Claire Bodson as Nathalie
 Pauline Étienne as Delphine
 Anne Coesens as Pascale
 Johan Leysen as Serge
 Thomas Coumans as Thomas

Accolades

References

External links

2000s French films
2008 films
2008 drama films
Belgian drama films
Belgian LGBT-related films
French drama films
French LGBT-related films
Teen LGBT-related films
LGBT-related drama films
Films directed by Joachim Lafosse
2008 LGBT-related films
2000s French-language films
French-language Belgian films